John William Burgess (August 26, 1844 – January 13, 1931) was an American political scientist. He spent most of his career at Columbia University and is regarded as having been "the most influential political scientist of the period".

Early life and education 
Burgess was born in Tennessee and fought for the Union Army in the U.S. Civil War. He attended Cumberland University, then undertook the study of history at Amherst College, graduating in 1867. From there he attended the universities of Göttingen, Leipzig, and Berlin for a number of years, where he studied under scholars including the historian Johann Gustav Droysen; the economist Wilhelm Roscher; the historian Theodor Mommsen, whose linking history with law strongly influenced Burgess's own approach; and Rudolf von Gneist. He was much influenced by the training in research methods characteristic of German universities of the time. He sought to import these methods of research and scholarship, first to Amherst (unsuccessfully) and later to Columbia.  He maintained a lifelong interest in German-American relations.

Career 
In 1876, Burgess was appointed to a professorship in the Law School of what later became Columbia University, a post he held until his 1912 retirement. While at Columbia, Burgess taught constitutional law but more importantly, was instrumental in founding the discipline of political science in the United States. In 1886, he founded the Political Science Quarterly. He was instrumental in establishing the Faculty of Political Science, the first major institutionalized program in the United States granting the degree of Doctor of Philosophy.  These endeavors have led to his being widely regarded as one of the founders of modern political science.

In 1906, Burgess was Roosevelt professor at the University of Berlin and in the summer semester of 1907, he held a guest lecture at the University of Leipzig.

Burgess was a strong influence on the Dunning School of Reconstruction. Burgess "agreed with the scholarly consensus that blacks were inferior", and wrote that "black skin means membership in a race of men which has never of itself succeeded in subjecting passion to reason, has never, therefore, created any civilization of any kind."

In a 1904, Burgess argued for close British, American and German relations, justifying it in part on the basis of "ethnic affinity". He also argued that Swedes, Danes, Norwegians and the Dutch were "probably the purest Teutonic stock, and the best stock, in Europe". He added that it was a "sober truth that the Teutonic genius and the Teutonic conscience are the two greatest forces in modern civilization and culture."

Until the 1990s, he was memorialized on the Columbia campus with the designation of the "Burgess-Carpenter Classics Library" within Butler Library. Nicholas Murray Butler credited the teachings of Burgess along with Alexander Hamilton for the philosophical basis of his Republicanism.

According to Leon Epstein, Burgess was a leading academic figure in the last decades of the nineteenth century, but some of his influence was considered negative (due to his advocation of formalism as it applied to politics and governance) and he caused somewhat of an intellectual rebellion at Columbia.

Works
1890: Political Science and Comparative Constitutional Law
1897: The Middle Period, 1817-1858
1901: The Civil War and the Constitution, 1859-1865
1902: Reconstruction and the Constitution 1866-1876
1915: The European War of 1914 - Its Causes Purposes and Probable Results
1915: The Reconciliation of Government with Liberty
1923:  Recent Changes in American Constitutional Theory

References

External links

 
 
 Remarkable Columbians: John W. Burgess.

1844 births
1931 deaths
American political scientists
Amherst College alumni
Columbia University faculty
Dunning School
People from Tennessee
American white supremacists